Metlink's Kapiti Line is the electrified southern portion of the North Island Main Trunk railway between New Zealand's capital city, Wellington, and Waikanae on the Kapiti Coast, operated by Transdev Wellington on behalf of Greater Wellington Regional Council. Trains run frequently every day, with stops at 16 stations. Until 20 February 2011 it was known as the Paraparaumu Line.

Construction 
The Kapiti Line was constructed by the Wellington and Manawatu Railway Company (W&MR) as part of its line between Wellington and Longburn, south of Palmerston North.  It was built by a group of Wellington businessmen frustrated with the indecision of the government about the construction of a west coast route out of Wellington.

Construction of the line began in September 1882 and followed a circuitous, steep route via Johnsonville. It was opened to Plimmerton in October 1885 and completed on 3 November 1886. The final spike was driven just north of Paraparaumu, at Otaihanga.

The government acquired the Wellington and Manawatu Railway Company on the 7 December 1908 and incorporated it into its national network as the southern portion of the North Island Main Trunk line.

Deviation and electrification 

In 1928, work began on a deviation to avoid the difficult section of the line between Wellington and Tawa through Johnsonville.  The deviation required the construction of two significant tunnels between Kaiwharawhara and Tawa.  It opened as a single track line to freight on 24 July 1935 and as a double track line to passengers on 19 June 1937. The Wellington to Johnsonville section was retained as the Johnsonville Line.

Electrification from Wellington to Paekakariki was completed on 24 July 1940, avoiding the smoke nuisance in the new deviation's lengthy second tunnel, and providing extra tractive effort on the Paekakariki Hill between Pukerua Bay and Paekakariki.  Paekakariki became a major station where long-distance trains swapped from steam (later diesel) to electric motive power and became the northern terminus of the commuter line for many years.  Electrification was extended to Paraparaumu on 7 May 1983 and to Waikanae on 20 February 2011.

Duplication
The W&MR constructed the line as a single-track railway with crossing loops at principal stations to allow opposing trains to pass. In the 1920s the need for extra train services on the line was recognised, both to increase the tonnage of goods trains and to allow more frequent suburban passenger services. To increase the number of trains that the line could carry, duplication and electrification of the line along with other improvements, such as curve easements, was planned and progressed in stages. The first section to bed double-tracked (from Wellington to Tawa Flat (now Tawa) was the Tawa Flat deviation. it bypassed the steep (1 in 36 to 40) grades from Wellington to Ngaio on the Johnsonville Line. The sections from Tawa to Porirua and subsequently from Porirua to the Pukerua Bay saddle were later double-tracked.

As part of the Plimmerton to Paekakariki duplication, a Westinghouse three-wire (two feed and one return) Centralised Train Control (CTC) system was installed in 1940; to control trains from Wellington. It was the first CTC system in New Zealand and the first outside the United States of America. This avoided the need for two new signal boxes at the North and South junctions and the need with "tablet" working to continuously man five stations with 3 or 4 tablet porters at each station (3 tablet porters at Porirua, Paremata and Pukerua Bay; and 4 tablet porters at Tawa Flat nd Plimmerton); so requiring 19 men for traffic working instead of 8 with CTC (and also 11 staff houses). CTC working applied between Paekakariki and Plimmerton on 25 February, Plimmerton and Paremata on 30 June and Tawa to Porirua on 4 December 1940; giving full traffic control from Wellington to Paekakariki (as Wellington to Tawa was double-tracked). 

From 14 June 1943 a siding for the US Marines' camp at Mackays Crossing with a crossing loop and tablet station was opened; near where the Wellington Tramway Museum is now located. With duplication of the track from Paekakariki to Mackays Crossing and automatic signalling from Paekakariki to Paraparaumu, Mackays Crossing was relay worked from the Paekakariki South signal box from December 1943. But on 25 March 1946 the catch points and two cross-overs of the siding were lifted, and Mackays Crossing became the point where the double-track section north ended.

Further duplication was delayed in the 1940s but continued in the 1950s with the completion of the Tawa to Porirua section on 15 December 1957. Double track from Porirua to Mana was opened on 7 November 1960. Harbour reclamation allowed mostly straight track with the line no longer following the curves of the shoreline bays north of Porirua. A new station and bridge at Paremata was required. The Mana to Plimmerton section was opened on 16 October 1961.

In conjunction with the extension of electrification to Paraparaumu in March 1983, double-track was extended from Paekakariki to Mackays Crossing on 5 December 1983. The section between Mackays Crossing and Paraparaumu, built across a peat swamp, remained single track. Extension of double track from Mackays Crossing to a junction south of the Waikanae River bridge was completed in February 2011 to coincide with the extension of electrification to Waikanae.

The North–South Junction section north of the South Junction (north of the former Muri Station, at the top of the Pukerua Saddle) and with five short single-track tunnels to the North Junction (at the northern portal of No 13 tunnel) before Paekakariki and along the coast below the steep and unstable Paekakariki Escarpment remains as a single track.

Operation 

From electrification in 1940 until the 1980s, the majority of commuter services on the line were operated by DM/D electric multiple units, with some carriage trains hauled by ED and EW electric locomotives, particularly at peak periods.  ED and EW locomotives also hauled freight trains over this section until the floors of the tunnels between Pukerua Bay and Paekakariki were lowered in 1967 and DA diesel locomotives could be used into Wellington.

In 1948 the traffic  over the 24 mile (38.5 km) Wellington to Paekakariki section averaged 30 passenger trains, 18 goods trains and 13 light engines (ED class) daily, with 67 daily crossings; opinion was that train delays were less frequent and of shorter duration with CTC than with Tyers Tablet control in 1937. The average tons per train was 474 tons per train northward and 473 southward, with passenger trains just over 560 tons in aggregate.

From 1982, the new EM/ET electric multiple units were delivered. They had been ordered to replace the wooden carriage trains hauled by electric locomotives on commuter services and largely displaced the DM/D units on the Paraparaumu Line.

By the 1980s, the ED and EW electric locomotives were not required for either freight trains or for commuter trains. They were retired due to age and lack of use, the EDs by 1981 and the EWs by 1988. From 2010 the introduction of the Matangi EMUs provided extra passenger capacity, and enabled the remaining DM/D EMUs to be withdrawn in 2012. A second batch of Matangi EMUs was then ordered to replace the EM/ET EMUs (rather than reconditioning them).

A proposal to extend the electrification to Waikanae was approved by the Greater Wellington Regional Council on 8 May 2007.  This project included the double tracking of the single track line between Mackays Crossing (between Paekakariki and Paraparaumu) as far as the rail underbridge and river bridge south of Waikanae.  The $90 million project started in December 2008, and was completed in 2011, with the first commuter trains to Waikanae on 20 February. Completion of the project was delayed to 2011 to minimise commuter disruption by working in the quiet end-of-year holiday period, according to ONTRACK program director David Gordon. The project involved 50 workers and 20 machines installing 600 traction poles in eight or nine metre deep holes, and laying 30 km of rail and 30,000 sleepers. The project allows commuter services from Waikanae every 15 minutes at peak travel times but more commonly every 30 minutes. The new Matangi electric multiple units were used on the Kapiti Line from mid-2011. Paraparaumu and Waikanae stations were upgraded at a cost of more than $1 million each. Upgrading Waikanae station rather than moving it south of Elizabeth Street or providing a road underpass was criticised locally, as frequent closing of the Elizabeth Street level crossing south of the station (which connected to State Highway through the town) could increase traffic congestion in Waikanae. However this has since been alleviated by the opening of the Kapiti Expressway which has moved the main road west and out of the centre of Waikanae itself.

Ten traction substations along the line take electricity from Wellington Electricity or Electra's 11,000-volt distribution network and transform and rectify it to 1500-volt direct current for the overhead traction lines. The substations are located at Wellington, Kaiwharawhara, Glenside, Paremata, Mana, Pukerua Bay, Paekakariki, Raumati, Lindale and Waikanae. Also along the line are two "cross-tie" substations at Ngauranga and Tawa, which provide a switching function but don't have transformers or rectifiers.

Public road-rail crossings have warning lights and barriers, and some are now fitted with automatically locking pedestrian gates to prevent use while alarms are operating.

In 2021 upgrading of the Plimmerton railway station started, to be completed by 2023. Some trains will then turn around at Plimmerton rather than Porirua thus increasing the peak capacity of the line by reducing the number of passengers on trains to Waikanae.

Accidents on line 
On 17 August 2021 a landslip blocked the Kapiti Line one kilometre south of the Fisherman’s Table restaurant at the north end of the single-line section, and derailed a Matangi train. The single-track section had had one slip alarm, but not on the section of line where the slip occurred. The Matangi EMUs are expected to be take months to repair, at a cost of up to half a million dollars.

Future

Proposals for new stations at Raumati South, between Mackays Crossing and Paraparaumu, and Lindale, north of Paraparaumu near Otaihanga, were on hold, to be reconsidered after 2010, as it was claimed that there were problems affecting a station at Raumati (the provision of access to SH 1 and park-and-ride facilities) and an unstable hillside behind the line.

The 2013 Review and Draft 2014 Review of the Wellington Regional Public Transport Plan confirmed that building additional stations on the Kapiti Line at Raumati and Lindale was no longer recommended, with the cost of new stations outweighing the benefits. The detailed analysis for Raumati (which was a "viability benchmark" for other new stations) said that the modelled peak-hour patronage needed to be about 300 new passengers to justify a new station, and that most Raumati users would have switched from Paraparaumu Station. Network extensions beyond the current Metlink rail operation limits would be by "shuttles or non-electrified services" running to Wellington.

Proposed infrastructure upgrades include sleeper replacement in tunnels, stabilisation of high-risk slopes and renewal of one bridge with timber elements. To cater for freight trains with more frequent passenger trains, there will be a new freight loop at Plimmerton or an improved loop at Porirua (2021/2022; $11.09 million); and Plimmerton will get a high capacity train turn-back facility as a terminal station (2021; $12.8 million). Power supply upgrades will allow more long (8 car) trains (2020; $10.1 million).

The single-track section above the coast between Pukerua Bay and Paekakariki (known as the North–South Junction) may also be double tracked through a single long double track tunnel (replacing five short tunnels) or replaced by a less steep deviation; although the proposal in 2007 was to daylight only the northernmost (No. 7) tunnel which is through rock, and have double track north from there.

Extension to Ōtaki
The two over bridges of the Peka Peka to Otaki expressway which opened in 2022 were designed to allow for a future double track line. A group known as "Save Kapiti" is actively campaigning for the extension. The Otaki Community Board also supports the extension of electrification. Provision has been made during road earthworks north of Waikanae for a future crossing loop between Peka Peka and Ōtaki. In 2012 the Greater Wellington Regional Council investigated extension of the electrification with Matangi trains north of Waikanae to Ōtaki (estimated cost $30 million for the Ōtaki project) and north of Upper Hutt to a new station at Timberlea.

In March 2014, the GWRC said that electrification to Ōtaki was estimated to cost $115 million to $135 million and was too costly for the number of new passengers it would attract (approximately 250 new passengers). Because the trip would take over an hour, new trains with toilets would be required. As an alternative to electrification, it was suggested that diesel multiple units could be used on services north of Waikanae. This could be a "final nail in the coffin" for the under-threat Capital Connection service from Wellington to Palmerston North, which also stops at Ōtaki. During the 2017 general election, the Green Party proposed extending electrification to Ōtaki as an alternative to the Northern Corridor extension from Pekapeka.

In the lead up to the local authority elections of 2019, candidate for Mayor of the Kapiti Coast District, Gwynn Compton, started a petition to extend electrification to Ōtaki.

During the 2020 general election the National Party announced that National would extend the electric commuter rail service to Ōtaki and fast-track a four-lane expressway from Ōtaki to Levin.

A business case for extending the line further to Levin has been pushed for by transport minister Michael Wood in 2022, adding an extra 35 km to the line, going past Ōtaki and possibly including Te Horo and Manakau.

See also 
 Capital Connection 
 List of Wellington railway stations
 North–South Junction (from Pukerua Bay to Paekakariki)

References

Citations

Bibliography

External links
Johnsonville Line signalling, 2014 article  
Auckland-Wellington Express between Porirua and Paremata (NIMT), c1932 

 
 
Photo of Paraparaumu station and commuter parking 
Photos of Takapu Road station 
Photos of Redwood station
Photos of Tawa station
Photos of Linden station
Ontrack: Kapiti Line upgrade project 2009-11 
 
 

Rail transport in Wellington
Public transport in the Wellington Region
Railway lines in New Zealand
Electric railways in New Zealand
3 ft 6 in gauge railways in New Zealand
Kapiti Coast District